Seeburg may refer to:

Places
Seeburg, Brandenburg, part of the municipality of Dallgow-Döberitz, Brandenburg, Germany
Seeburg, Lower Saxony, in the district of Göttingen, Lower Saxony, Germany
Seeburg, Lucerne, a suburb of the city of Lucerne, Switzerland
Seeburg, Saxony-Anhalt, in the district Mansfeld-Südharz, Saxony-Anhalt, Germany
Seeburg, the German name for Jeziorany, in the Warmian-Masurian Voivodeship, Poland
Grobiņa in Latvia.

Other
Seeburg Corporation, an American company that produced jukeboxes 1928–1989
Seeburg plotting table, (in German: Seeburg-Tisch), a table that was used to track and control aircraft during WWII.

See also 
 Seeberg (disambiguation)